Duckwitzbreen is a glacier on Barentsøya, Svalbard. It is an offshoot of Barentsjøkulen, reaching down to the sea in the western direction. The glacier is named after German politician Arnold Duckwitz.

References

Glaciers of Svalbard
Barentsøya